The Paard van Marken is a lighthouse on the Dutch peninsula Marken, on the IJsselmeer. It was built in 1839 by J. Valk. A primitive lighthouse had been on the location since the early 18th century; the current lighthouse has been a listed building (Rijksmonument) since 1970.

The lighthouse is inhabited and thus cannot be visited.

See also

 List of lighthouses in the Netherlands

References

External links

Lighthouses completed in 1839
Lighthouses in North Holland
Rijksmonuments in North Holland
Marken